Prefoldin subunit 3 (VBP-1), also Von Hippel–Lindau binding protein 1, is a prefoldin chaperone protein that binds to von Hippel–Lindau protein and transports it from perinuclear granules to the nucleus or cytoplasm inside the cell. It is also involved in transporting nascent polypeptides to cytosolic chaperonins for post-translational folding.

VBP-1 is a 197–amino acid heterohexamer comprising two prefoldin-α and four prefoldin-β subunits, and is a member of the prefoldin-α subunit family. It is ubiquitously expressed in tissues, and is located in the cell nucleus and cytoplasm. The VBP1 gene is located at Xq28. Homologues are known to exist between human VBP-1 and proteins in mice, Drosophila and C. elegans.

See also
Von Hippel–Lindau tumor suppressor
Von Hippel–Lindau disease
Eugen von Hippel
Arvid Lindau

References

External links
 

Proteins